Raisa Soltamuradovna Akhmatova (13 December 1928 – 29 January 1992) was an internationally recognized Chechen poet. Raisa's poems have been especially popular among ethnic Chechens and Ingush worldwide, although her entire archive (containing over 600 files) was destroyed when Russian forces burned the Chechen National Archives during the First Chechen War. Akhmatova is known for writing poem collections such as: Native Republic (1958), Strike Me in the Face, Wind (1959), I'm Coming to You (1960), Difficult Love (1963),  and Revelation (1964).

Bibliography
Хьоме республика (Республика родная) (1957)
Бей мне, ветер, в лицо (1959)
Иду к тебе (1960)
Трудная любовь (1963)
Откровение (1964)

References

External links
Chechnya Free.ru Article on Raisa Akhmatova
Mirslov Encyclopedia Article Entry
KavkazChat Thread on Raisa Akhmatova

Chechen poets
1928 births
1992 deaths
Chechen people
20th-century poets